The FEAR militia (Forever Enduring, Always Ready) was an American terrorist group of between four and eleven individuals that the State of Georgia alleged in 2012 to have planned to destroy a dam and poison apple orchards in Washington State, set off explosives in Forsyth Park in Savannah, Georgia, and assassinate President Barack Obama. Four of the individuals charged were soldiers stationed at Fort Stewart, Georgia. The group killed two people in an attempt to prevent them from revealing their plans to the public. The group used the Army to recruit militia members, who wore distinctive tattoos that resemble an anarchy symbol.

Murder of Deirdre Aguigui 
On July 17, 2011, Isaac Aguigui strangled his wife Deirdre. She was approximately 7 months pregnant at the time. He received $100,000 in death benefits and an additional $400,000 from a life insurance policy; part of the funds were then used to arm the group.

Murders of Michael Roark and Tiffany York 
On December 6, 2011, the bodies of 19-year-old Michael Roark and his girlfriend, 17-year-old Tiffany York, were found by two fishermen near a rural road in southeastern Georgia.  On December 10, four soldiers based in nearby Fort Stewart were arrested in connection with the killings - Private Christopher Salmon, Sergeant Anthony Peden, Pvt. Isaac Aguigui, and Private First Class Michael Burnett. The soldiers ranged in age from 19 (Aguigui) to 26 (Burnett). Two days later, Salmon and Peden were charged in Long County court with malice murder. Aguigui and Burnett were charged with being a party to murder. All four were denied bond. According to Salmon, Roark was killed for taking money from the group's bank account and out of suspicion that Roark was going to expose the group to police.

In August 2012, Burnett agreed to plead guilty to a lesser charge of manslaughter in exchange for testifying against Salmon, Peden, and Aguigui.

On September 11, 2012, five more men (Christopher Jenderseck, Timothy Martin Joiner, Adam Dearman, Randall Blake Dearman and Anthony Garner) were indicted on various counts of tampering with evidence, burglary, theft, criminal damage to property, and violations of the Street Gang Terrorism and Prevention Act in connection with the militia. On October 15, Jenderseck, a former Army medic, pleaded guilty to destruction of evidence of the murders (specifically, a mobile phone, spent shotgun shells, and blood-spattered clothes), and received seven years of probation in exchange for agreeing to testify against the remaining defendants and any future defendants in the case.

Verdicts and sentences
In July 2013, ringleader Aguigui pleaded guilty to malice murder, felony murder, criminal gang activity, aggravated assault, and using a firearm while committing a felony. He was sentenced to life in prison without the possibility of parole. Salmon pleaded guilty to malice murder in April 2014 and accepted a sentence of life in prison with no chance of parole. Salmon's wife Heather Salmon took a plea deal and was sentenced to 20 years in prison after pleading guilty to voluntary manslaughter.

In March 2014, Aguigui was convicted of murdering his pregnant wife, Deirdre Aguigui, and unborn child in July 2011. Aguigui was sentenced to a second life sentence with no possibility of parole.

In May 2014, Peden pleaded guilty to malice murder and received a life sentence that included the possibility of parole after at least 30 years in prison.

In February 2016, Burnett was sentenced to 8 years in prison and 40 years of court supervision. Additional defendants pled to lesser charges of illegally purchasing guns, theft, and selling drugs in order to purchase guns and land to set up a compound in Washington state.

References 

Terrorism in the United States
Survivalism in the United States
Right-wing militia organizations in the United States
Paramilitary organizations based in the United States
Neo-fascist terrorism